Brushy is a census-designated place (CDP) in Sequoyah County, Oklahoma,  United States, along U.S. Route 59 in the foothills of the Brushy Mountains. It is part of the Fort Smith, Arkansas-Oklahoma Metropolitan Statistical Area. The population was 900 at the 2010 census, an increase of 14.4 percent over the figure of 787 recorded in 2000.

Geography

Demographics

As of the census of 2000, there were 787 people, 283 households, and 232 families residing in the CDP. There were 319 housing units at an average density of 12.2/sq mi (4.7/km2). The racial makeup of the CDP was 59.47% White, 0.13% African American, 25.41% Native American, 0.13% Pacific Islander, 1.14% from other races, and 13.72% from two or more races. Hispanic or Latino of any race were 2.54% of the population.

There were 283 households, out of which 36.7% had children under the age of 18 living with them, 69.6% were married couples living together, 9.5% had a female householder with no husband present, and 17.7% were non-families. 15.5% of all households were made up of individuals, and 7.1% had someone living alone who was 65 years of age or older. The average household size was 2.78 and the average family size was 3.10.

In the CDP, the population was spread out, with 26.0% under the age of 18, 8.0% from 18 to 24, 31.4% from 25 to 44, 24.8% from 45 to 64, and 9.8% who were 65 years of age or older. The median age was 36 years. For every 100 females, there were 106.6 males. For every 100 females age 18 and over, there were 104.2 males.

The median income for a household in the CDP was $26,853, and the median income for a family was $31,563. Males had a median income of $25,227 versus $18,125 for females. The per capita income for the CDP was $12,230. About 18.3% of families and 20.1% of the population were below the poverty line, including 21.5% of those under age 18 and 29.4% of those age 65 or over.

References

Further reading
 Shirk, George H.; Oklahoma Place Names; University of Oklahoma Press; Norman, Oklahoma; 1987: .

Census-designated places in Sequoyah County, Oklahoma
Census-designated places in Oklahoma
Fort Smith metropolitan area